Andrew McDowall (or Douall), Lord Bankton (1685–1760) was a Scottish law lord and Senator of the College of Justice.

Life

He was born the second son of Robert McDowall of Logan, East Ayrshire and his wife, Sarah Shaw daughter of John Shaw of Greenock. Andrew trained in Law at Edinburgh University and passed the Scottish bar as an advocate around 1705. He became a successful advocate in Edinburgh.

In 1745 he purchased Bankton House in Prestonpans, east of Edinburgh, from the estate of the late Col.Gardiner who had been killed in the Battle of Prestonpans.

On 5 July 1755 he was elected a Senator of the College of Justice in place of the late John Sinclair, Lord Murkle.

He died at Bankton House on 22 October 1760. His position as Senator was filled by James Veitch, Lord Elliock.

Publications

An Institute of the Laws of Scotland in Civil Rights (4 vols) 1751 to 1758 which compares the differences between Scottish and English Laws and continues in use as a reference book.

Family

In 1743 (aged 58) he was married to Helen Grant. They had no children.

Artistic Recognition

He was portrayed around 1756 by William Millar and the Scottish National Portrait Gallery hold an etching of Lord Bankton by Thomas Worlidge.

References
 

1685 births
1760 deaths
Senators of the College of Justice